Sitapur may refer to:

Towns in India
Sitapur, Uttar Pradesh
 Sitapur, Chhattisgarh

Villages in Nepal
Sitapur, Arghakhanchi
Sitapur, Banke
Sitapur, Sagarmatha